Cyril Raffaelli (born 1 April 1974), sometimes credited as Cyril Xavier Cuenel Raffaelli and Cyril Quenel-Raffaelli, is a French traceur, martial artist and stuntman.

Biography
Utilizing shotokan karate and wushu, Raffaelli has been a regular in films with Luc Besson and David Belle, the latter being a friend of his.

Acting career
Raffaelli starred last in the war-horror film Djinns.

Championships and accomplishments
IKFF Combat Combiné World Cup (1997) - Winner
IKFF Combat Combiné bronze medalist (1999)
1998 France San da Champion

Filmography
Raffaelli is uncredited in some of his films - here is a partial list:

References

External links

1974 births
French stunt performers
Living people
Traceurs
French male karateka
Shotokan practitioners
French gymnasts
French wushu practitioners
French sanshou practitioners
French people of Italian descent
Place of birth missing (living people)
20th-century French people